NAAG may refer to:
 National Association of Attorneys General, a US organization
 N-Acetylaspartylglutamic acid, a neurotransmitter
 Naag  is the Hindi name for the Asian Cobra
 NATO Army Armament Group, one of the Major Armament Groups (MAG) of the North Atlantic Treaty Organization